Upper Culham is a hamlet in the English county of Berkshire, within the civil parish of Wargrave. 

Hamlets in Berkshire
Borough of Wokingham